The  following is a list of awards and nominations received by Danish-American actor, producer, author, musician, photographer, poet, and painter Viggo Mortensen.

Major associations

Academy Awards

BAFTA Awards

Golden Globe Awards

Screen Actors Guild Awards

Other awards and nominations

Academy of Canadian Cinema and Television

British Independent Film Awards

Canadian Screen Awards

Chicago Film Critics Association

Critics' Choice Movie Awards

Empire Awards

Fangoria Chainsaw Awards

Florida Film Critics Circle

Goya Awards

Houston Film Critics Society

Independent Spirit Awards

London Film Critics Circle

National Board of Review

New York Film Critics Circle

Online Film Critics Society

San Diego Film Critics Society

Sant Jordi Awards

Santa Barbara International Film Festival

Satellite Awards

Saturn Awards

SFX Award

St. Louis Gateway Film Critics Association

Toronto Film Critics Association

Vancouver Film Critics Circle

Washington D.C. Area Film Critics Association

References

External links
 

Mortensen, Viggo